Elementary School Musical  may refer to:

 "Elementary School Musical" (South Park), a 2008 episode of the animated television series South Park
 "Elementary School Musical" (The Simpsons), a 2010 episode of the animated television series The Simpsons

See also 
 School musical, musical theatre performed in schools